The Ven (Reginald) Brian Harris (b 14 August 1934)  was  Archdeacon of Manchester from 1980  to 1998.

He was educated at Eltham College and Christ's College, Cambridge After curacies in Wednesbury and Uttoxeter he held incumbencies in Bury and Bolton. He was the Rural Dean of Walmsley from 1970 to 1980;  and a Canon Residentiary at Manchester Cathedral from 1980 until 1998.

References

1934 births
People educated at Eltham College
Alumni of Christ's College, Cambridge
Archdeacons of Manchester
Living people